Ritchie Makuma Mpasa (born 6 May 1985 in Vitry-sur-Seine) is a French footballer currently playing for AC Amiens as a defender. He previously played in Ligue 2 with Amiens SC.

References
 Ritchie Makuma profile at foot-national.com
 
 

1985 births
Living people
People from Vitry-sur-Seine
French footballers
French sportspeople of Democratic Republic of the Congo descent
Amiens SC players
Angers SCO players
Vannes OC players
AS Beauvais Oise players
AC Amiens players
Ligue 2 players
Championnat National players
Association football defenders
Footballers from Val-de-Marne
Black French sportspeople